Joseph Luco Pagano (1928–1989) was a New York mobster and member of the Genovese crime family. 

Born in New York, Pagano and his brother Pasquale Pagano joined the Genovese family in the late 1940s. With an arrest record dating back to 1946, Pagano has been charged with robbery, assault with a deadly weapon, and narcotics trafficking. Pagano worked with Genovese mobster and future government informant Joe Valachi in Anthony Strollo's organization, then one of the biggest distributors of heroin and cocaine in the East Harlem section of Manhattan.  While working for Strollo, Pagano participated in the gangland slaying of Eugenio Giannini and Steve Franse. In 1955, Pagano served a seven-year prison term. 

In a 1977 article, the New York Times said that Pagano had ordered beatings and arson attacks against Bronx health facility operators to gain their participation in a scheme to extort thousands of dollars from the Medicaid health insurance fund.

In 1989, Pagano died in his Upstate New York home.

Further reading
Goldstock, Ronald, Martin Marcus and Il Thacher. Corruption and Racketeering in the New York City Construction Industry: Final Report of the New York State Organized Crime Task Force. New York: NYU Press, 1990. 
Jacobs, James B., Coleen Friel and Robert Radick. Gotham Unbound: How New York City Was Liberated from the Grip of Organized Crime. New York: NYU Press, 2001. 
United States. Congress. Senate. Committee on Governmental Affairs. Permanent Subcommittee on Investigations. Profile of Organized Crime, Mid-Atlantic Region: Hearings Before the Permanent Subcommittee on Investigations. 1983. 
Pearson, John, One of The Family: The Englishman and The Mafia, Century

References
Devito, Carlo. Encyclopedia of International Organized Crime. New York: Facts On File, Inc., 2005. 

1928 births
1989 deaths
American gangsters of Italian descent
Genovese crime family